Wilfrido Ramos-Orench (born May 4, 1940) is an Episcopal bishop. From 2014-2017 he served as the Provisional Bishop of the Diocese of Puerto Rico. He was a suffragan bishop in the Diocese of Connecticut from 2000 to 2006, and the provisional bishop of the Diocese of Central Ecuador from 2006 to 2009.

Early life and education
Ramos was born on May 4, 1940, and is a native of Yauco, Puerto Rico. He is one of three siblings to join the priesthood and one of two to become bishops.

Ordained ministry
He was consecrated on October 14, 2000 as the 960th bishop in order of consecration of the Episcopal Church of the United States and served as suffragan bishop in the Diocese of Connecticut. He was installed as Provisional Bishop in Ecuador on September 13, 2006.

On January 25, 2014, Ramos was appointed the provisional bishop of the Diocese of Puerto Rico. He will continue as such until the successor of Bishop David Álvarez, who retired on October 31, 2013, as Diocesan Bishop, is selected and installed.  at a special ceremony on March 28, 2014, in San Juan commemorating Bishop Ramos' new designation, with the attendance of eight other bishops. One of them, his brother José Antonio Ramos-Orench, delivered the homily. On January 25, 2014, his appointment as provisional bishop of Puerto Rico was ratified by a large majority of the Diocesan Assembly.

References

1940 births
Living people
Puerto Rican Episcopalians
Puerto Rican bishops
People from Yauco, Puerto Rico
Episcopal Church in Connecticut
Episcopal bishops of Puerto Rico
Episcopal bishops of Central Ecuador
Episcopal bishops of Connecticut